Aasiya Zubair, also known as Aasiya Hassan (June 17, 1972 – February 12, 2009) was married to Muzzammil Hassan, the Pakistani-American founder and owner of Bridges TV, the first American Muslim English-language television network. In February 2009, she was found dead, beheaded, at the Bridges TV station after her estranged husband turned himself in to a police station and was charged with second-degree murder.

Career
Zubair was an architect by training.  Worried by the negative perceptions of Muslims, she "felt there should be an American Muslim media where her kids could grow up feeling really strong about their identity as an American Muslim" and came up with the idea for Bridges TV. She also studied for an MBA at State University of New York College at Buffalo from 2007 to 2009.

Zubair was the focus of a cover story in the Vol. 3, Issue 2 (2003) issue of Azizah Magazine; her face appeared on the cover. Journalist Nadirah Sabir wrote about how Zubair conceived the idea of the nation's first Muslim television channel.

Murder 
Muzzamill Hassan lured Zubair to the television studio where they worked together, on February 12, 2009. He attacked her with two hunting knives, stabbing her forty times and finally severing her head. Zubair had filed for divorce a week prior to her murder.

Legacy
In addition to her pioneering work as a broadcaster, Zubair is being remembered as a catalyst for heightened awareness of the issue of domestic violence, especially in the North American Muslim community.  Wajahat Ali, acclaimed playwright and founder of GoatMilk, wrote in The Guardian that "[t]he absolute brutality of Aasiya's murder has served as a clarion call to many American Muslims who have passionately responded to the tragedy with a resounding desire to confront this festering calamity." Imam Mohamed Hagmagid Ali, vice-president of The Islamic Society of North America, stated: "This is a wake up call to all of us, that violence against women is real and can not be ignored. It must be addressed collectively by every member of our community."

A nationwide, unified effort entitled "Imams Speak Out: Domestic Violence Will Not Be Tolerated in Our Communities" commenced in February 2009 asking all imams and religious leaders to discuss the Zubair murder, as well as domestic violence, in their weekly sermon on their Friday prayer services.

On February 7, 2011, Muzzammil Hassan was found guilty of second degree murder for beheading his wife of eight years, Aasiya Zubair. He was sentenced to  25 years to life imprisonment. He is currently serving time at the Clinton Correctional Facility, Dannemora.

In 2012, the first International Purple Hijab Day was celebrated to call attention to domestic violence against women. Alaa Murabit, founder of The Voice of Libyan Women, said that "Purple Hijab Day directly contests a Muslim's falsely perceived right to abuse a wife, daughter, mother, or sister." International Purple Hijab Day is celebrated the second Saturday in February in order to honor the memory of Zubair.

See also
 Muzzammil Hassan: Reaction to Arrest

References

External links
Bridges TV
In Memory of Aasiya Zubair (Facebook group)
International Purple Hijab Day

1972 births
2009 deaths
20th-century American architects
Allegations of honor killing
American Muslims
American murder victims
American television executives
Women television executives
Architects from New York (state)
Deaths by decapitation
Honor killing in the United States
Honor killing victims
People murdered in New York (state)
History of women in New York (state)
Uxoricides